Walter Wells Bowman (born August 11, 1870) was a Canadian soccer player who played as an outside right. He was the first non-British player to play in the Football League.

References

External links
 / Canada Soccer Hall of Fame

1870 births
1948 deaths

Canadian expatriate soccer players
Canadian people of Scottish descent
Canadian soccer players
Expatriate footballers in England
Manchester City F.C. players
Sportspeople from Waterloo, Ontario
Soccer people from Ontario
English Football League players
Association football outside forwards
Canadian expatriate sportspeople in England
Canadian people of Swiss descent